The 1927 Norwegian Football Cup was the 26th season of the Norwegian annual knockout football tournament. The tournament was open for all members of NFF, except those from Northern Norway. Last years losing finalist Ørn won 4–0 against Drafn in the final, and won their second title. Odd were the defending champions, but were eliminated by Drafn in the quarterfinal. The final was the first and only final that was played in Sandefjord.

First round

{{OneLegResult|Hardy||3–2 |Minde}}

|-
|colspan="3" style="background-color:#97DEFF"|Replay

|}

Second round

|-
|colspan="3" style="background-color:#97DEFF"|Replay

|}

Third round

|}

Fourth round

|-
|colspan="3" style="background-color:#97DEFF"|Replay

|}

Quarter-finals

|colspan="3" style="background-color:#97DEFF"|25 September 1927|}

Semi-finals

|colspan="3" style="background-color:#97DEFF"|2 October 1927'''

|}

Final

See also
1927 in Norwegian football

References

Norwegian Football Cup seasons
Norway
Cup